Maldon District Council in Essex, England is elected every four years.

Political control
Since the first election to the council in 1973 political control of the council has been held by the following parties:

Leadership
The leaders of the council since 2015 have been:

Council elections
1973 Maldon District Council election
1976 Maldon District Council election
1979 Maldon District Council election (New ward boundaries)
1983 Maldon District Council election
1987 Maldon District Council election
1991 Maldon District Council election (District boundary changes took place but the number of seats remained the same)
1995 Maldon District Council election
1999 Maldon District Council election
2003 Maldon District Council election (New ward boundaries increased the number of seats by 1)
2007 Maldon District Council election
2011 Maldon District Council election
2015 Maldon District Council election
2019 Maldon District Council election

By-election results

1999-2003

2003-2007

2007-2016

By-election triggered by the resignation of the previous Conservative Party councillor.

*BNP candidate standing under the description "Fighting Unsustainable Housing because we care"

2016-2026 
By-election in Wickham Bishops and Woodham ward held on 24 February 2022. It was triggered by the resignation of an Independent councillor.

 Simon John Neville Morgan (Conservative) - 361 votes (elected)
 Lance Peatling (Liberal Democrats) - 161 votes
 Colin Baldy (Independent) - 80 votes
 Matthew Wallis-Keyes (Labour Party) - 66 votes

References

By-election results

External links
Maldon District Council

 
Council elections in Essex
Politics of Maldon District
District council elections in England